Pervis Josué Estupiñán Tenorio (born 21 January 1998) is an Ecuadorian professional footballer who plays as a left-back for  club Brighton & Hove Albion and the Ecuador national team.

Club career
Born in Esmeraldas, Estupiñán joined LDU Quito's youth setup in 2011, aged 13. He was promoted to the first team ahead of the 2015 season, and made his professional debut on 1 February of that year by starting in a 1–0 home win against El Nacional.

Watford and Following Loans 
An undisputed starter for the club, Estupiñán was sold to Premier League club Watford on 29 July 2016, being immediately loaned to Granada CF and assigned to the latter's B-team in Segunda División B.

Estupiñán made his La Liga debut on 5 April 2017, starting in a 0–0 away draw against Deportivo de La Coruña. On 17 July, he was loaned to Segunda División side UD Almería for one year.

On 9 August 2018, Estupiñán agreed to a one-year loan deal with RCD Mallorca in the second division. The following 3 July, after achieving promotion, he signed a two-year loan deal with CA Osasuna, also freshly promoted.

Villarreal 

On 16 September 2020, Estupiñán signed a seven-year contract with Spanish side Villarreal for an initial fee of £15 million.

Brighton and Hove Albion 

On 16 August 2022, Estupiñán signed a five-year contract with Premier League side Brighton & Hove Albion for an undisclosed fee. He made his debut four days later, coming on and replacing Adam Lallana in the 63rd minute in the 2–0 away win over West Ham. Estupiñán made his first start for the Seagulls on 27 August, helping Brighton to another win and clean sheet in the 1–0 home victory over Leeds. Estupiñán assisted returning World Cup champion Alexis Mac Allister's flick-in in the 5–1 away victory over EFL Championship side Middlesbrough in the FA Cup third round on 7 January 2023. Two weeks later, on his 25th birthday, he made a brace of assists, setting up both Kaoru Mitoma's opening goal and Evan Ferguson's late equaliser in the 2–2 away draw at Leicester City in the league. On 29 January, Estupiñán added to his three recent assists to make it four in as many games. Lobbing in a cross to the back post, finding Mitoma who brought the ball under control and fired Albion to a 2–1 victory over Liverpool to advance to the fifth round of the FA Cup. Two games later on 11 February, he added a further assist to his tally, with his searching delivery finding Solly March who fired in his effort to open the scoreline in the eventual 1–1 away draw against rivals Crystal Palace. Early on in the game he had a goal wrongly ruled out by John Brooks of VAR after the official drew the offside lines against the wrong player. Brooks was later dropped for his next two matches.

International career
Estupiñán made his debut for the Ecuador national team on 13 October 2019 in a friendly against Argentina that ended in 6–1 loss.

On 14 November, Estupiñán was named in Ecuador's 26-man squad for the 2022 FIFA World Cup alongside Brighton teammates Jeremy Sarmiento and Moisés Caicedo.

Career statistics

Club

International 

Scores and results list Ecuador's goal tally first, score column indicates score after each Estupiñán goal.

Honours
Villarreal
UEFA Europa League: 2020–21

Individual
Copa América Team of the Tournament: 2021

References

External links

1998 births
Living people
Sportspeople from Esmeraldas, Ecuador
Ecuadorian footballers
Association football fullbacks
L.D.U. Quito footballers
Watford F.C. players
Club Recreativo Granada players
Granada CF footballers
UD Almería players
RCD Mallorca players
CA Osasuna players
Villarreal CF players
Brighton & Hove Albion F.C. players
Ecuadorian Serie A players
La Liga players
Segunda División players
Segunda División B players
Premier League players
UEFA Europa League winning players
Ecuador youth international footballers
Ecuador under-20 international footballers
Ecuador international footballers
2021 Copa América players
2022 FIFA World Cup players
Ecuadorian expatriate footballers
Ecuadorian expatriate sportspeople in England
Ecuadorian expatriate sportspeople in Spain
Expatriate footballers in England
Expatriate footballers in Spain